Kalush (stylised in all caps) is a Ukrainian rap group formed in 2019. The group consists of founder and rapper Oleh Psiuk, multi-instrumentalist Ihor Didenchuk, and breakdancer MC KylymMen. Didenchuk is also a member of the electro-folk band Go_A, which represented Ukraine in the Eurovision Song Contest 2021.

Unlike the original line-up, Kalush Orchestra focuses on hip hop blended with folk motifs and elements from Ukrainian traditional music. On 14 May 2022, the group won the Eurovision Song Contest 2022 with 631 points, securing Ukraine's third Eurovision victory with their song "".

History 

Kalush was formed in 2019 by Oleh Psiuk and Ihor Didenchuck, together with Daniil Chernov as MC KylymMen. The group was named after Psiuk's hometown of Kalush, Ivano-Frankivsk Oblast. Their debut single "" was released in October 2019. After the release of their second single "" in November 2019, Kalush signed a recording contract with the American hip hop label Def Jam Recordings.

On 19 February 2021, the trio released their debut album , named after a neighbourhood of the town Kalush. On 23 July 2021, Kalush released their second album, entitled , together with rapper .

Kalush Orchestra 
In 2021, Kalush announced the launch of the side project Kalush Orchestra, which focuses on hip hop with folk motifs and elements from Ukrainian traditional music. The core members of Kalush were joined by multi-instrumentalists Tymofii Muzychuk and Vitalii Duzhyk, and backing vocalist Andrii Handziuk (alias Dzhonni Dyvnyy, or Johnny Da Strange). The group's members ask to distinguish between Kalush and Kalush Orchestra, stating that they are intended to be two different groups.

2022: Vidbir and Eurovision Song Contest 

In the final of the national selection Vidbir, they placed second with 14 points (six from the jury and eight from the audience). Due to technical difficulties that occurred during the voting process, Psiuk believed that Alina Pash had been wrongly chosen as the winner.

Despite coming in second place, the band were offered the chance to represent Ukraine at Eurovision, after Pash withdrew her candidacy due to controversy regarding her travel history in Crimea. On 22 February, Kalush Orchestra accepted the offer. On the same day, the Ukrainian public broadcaster UA:PBC published the official voting results of Vidbir 2022, confirming that Pash had been correctly chosen as the winner, contrary to Psiuk's claims.

During the 2022 Russian invasion of Ukraine, Daniil Chernov has been serving in the Territorial Defense Forces around the capital Kyiv. When the group left the country for the Eurovision Song Contest in April that year, fellow dancer Vlad Kurochka replaced him as MC KylymMen, while  (alias Sasha Tab) replaced Dzhonni Dyvnyy as backing vocalist. Dzhonni Dyvnyy stated that he could not travel to Turin due to commitments with other musical projects.

The group won the Eurovision final on 14 May with 631 points, securing Ukraine's third Eurovision victory. "" became the first song with rap lyrics to win the contest, as well as the winning song with the highest number of televote points in the history of the contest. The group later announced that they would put their Eurovision trophy up for auction to raise money for the Ukrainian armed forces. The group subsequently embarked on a promotional tour across Europe and North America to raise awareness and donations for Ukrainian efforts in combating the Russian invasion.

Members

Current members 
 Oleh Psiuk (2019–present)rap
 Ihor Didenchuk (2019–present)instrumentals
 Vlad Kurochka (2022–present)breakdance (MC KylymMen)

Kalush Orchestra 
 Tymofii Muzychuk (2021–present)vocals, telenka
 Vitalii Duzhyk (2021–present)sopilka
 Dzhonni Dyvnyy (2021–2022, 2022–present)backing vocals
 Sasha Tab (2022–present)backing vocals

Past members 
 Daniil Chernov (2019–2022)breakdance (MC KylymMen)

Discography

Albums

Singles

As Kalush

As Kalush Orchestra

As featured artist

Non-single album appearances

Awards and nominations

References 

2019 establishments in Ukraine
Def Jam Recordings artists
Eurovision Song Contest entrants of 2022
Eurovision Song Contest entrants for Ukraine
Eurovision Song Contest winners
Musical groups established in 2019
Pop-folk music groups
Pop-rap groups
Ukrainian anti-war activists
Ukrainian hip hop groups